Slaviša Jokanović (born 16 August 1968) is a Serbian professional football manager and former player. He is the manager of Russian club Dynamo Moscow.

A physical player considered strong in the air, he impressed at Partizan before spending seven seasons in La Liga at the service of three clubs, appearing in 208 matches and scoring 31 goals, mainly for Tenerife. He also played two years with Chelsea towards the end of his career, and represented Yugoslavia at the 1998 World Cup and Euro 2000, earning 64 caps and scoring ten goals in an 11-year international career.

Jokanović began his managerial career in 2007, winning two consecutive doubles with Partizan, the 2012 Thai Premier League with Muangthong United and leading Watford and Fulham to promotion to the Premier League in 2015 and 2018 respectively.

Club career

Early career
Born in Novi Sad, Vojvodina, SFR Yugoslavia, Jokanović started playing with his hometown club FK Novi Sad, and made his senior debut with neighbouring FK Vojvodina, helping it win its second national title in the 1988–89 season, with four goals in 24 matches.

In 1990, Jokanović joined Belgrade's FK Partizan. In his second year he helped the team win the domestic cup and, in his third, he scored 13 league goals (a career best), being one of several players to net in double digits – the team scored 103 in 36 matches – en route to the league conquest.

After his displays at Partizan, Jokanović signed for Real Oviedo in Spain. During his two-year spell he partnered compatriots Janko Janković, Nikola Jerkan and Robert Prosinečki and, subsequently, he joined fellow La Liga club CD Tenerife, being instrumental in their domestic and European consolidation.

Deportivo de La Coruña
In the summer 1999, Jokanović signed for Deportivo de La Coruña at the insistence of coach Javier Irureta, who deployed him in a partnership with Brazilians Donato and Mauro Silva. The trio combined for 85 matches and five goals as the Galicians won their first ever league title.

Chelsea
After only one season with Deportivo, Jokanović signed with Chelsea in October 2000, for £1.7 million. Under coach Claudio Ranieri, he appeared 39 times for the Blues over two consecutive Premier League seasons and played a total of 53 matches. He was released in July 2002 at nearly 34. 

He subsequently retired from professional football after playing just three months in the Spanish second division with Ciudad de Murcia.

International career
Jokanović played six times for SFR Yugoslavia, his debut coming on 27 February 1991 in a friendly with Turkey, when he played the last ten minutes after replacing Željko Petrović. He then appeared in some UEFA Euro 1992 qualifying matches, helping the national team to top its group; he was selected for the final tournament, but the team would be suspended due to the Yugoslav Wars.

Jokanović represented FR Yugoslavia in a further 58 matches, appearing for the nation at the 1998 FIFA World Cup and Euro 2000. In the former competition, he scored his first two international goals in an 8–1 away win over the Faroe Islands in qualification before playing four complete matches as the national team reached the round-of-16; in the latter he appeared three times, being sent off against Spain in a 3–4 loss, with the team reaching the quarter-finals.

Coaching career

Partizan
Jokanović was living in Madrid when, in September 2007, he joined the technical staff of Tercera División club CA Pinto. However, three months later, he became the head coach of Partizan, replacing Miroslav Đukić who left to take the reins of the national team. His family (wife and three children) remained in the Spanish capital.

In May 2008, under Jokanović's management, Partizan won the double (league and cup). He was also selected as the year's "Best Coach in Serbia" by the Football Association of Serbia, but refused to receive this award due to Partizan's poor results in the group stage of the UEFA Cup.

Jokanović led Partizan to another double in his first full season, winning the league by a margin of 19 points over former team Vojvodina. Thus, he became the first coach in the club's history to successfully defend the accolades; on 5 September 2009, however, he left the post by mutual consent, bidding farewell through an open letter.

Thailand, Bulgaria and Spain
On 28 February 2012, Muangthong United F.C. introduced Jokanović as their new head coach, and he signed a one-year contract with an option for a further two years. In his first and only season, he led the team to the third Thai Premier League title in their history, going undefeated in the process.

In mid-July 2013, Jokanović replaced Nikolay Mitov as manager of Bulgarian team PFC Levski Sofia. He was relieved of his duties in October, due to poor results, but club supporters claimed that he should have been given time to change things around.

On 5 May 2014, Spain's Hércules CF appointed Jokanović as coach until the end of the season, replacing Quique Hernández who had been sacked with the team in last place in the Segunda División table. He only managed one win in his five matches in charge, in an eventual relegation.

Watford

On 7 October 2014, Jokanović was appointed on a short-term contract at the helm of English Championship club Watford, their fourth coach in five weeks. Under his leadership, the Hornets were promoted to the Premier League with one match to spare, sealing it with a 2–0 win at Brighton & Hove Albion on 25 April 2015 for their 15th win in 20 matches; the team was also minutes away from winning the league title in the final match, but conceded an injury-time equaliser to Sheffield Wednesday that allowed AFC Bournemouth to overtake them. On 5 June, after failing to agree to a new deal, Jokanović left and was replaced by Quique Sánchez Flores.

Maccabi Tel Aviv
On 14 June 2015, Jokanović was appointed as coach of Maccabi Tel Aviv. On 25 August, he led the club to the group stage of the UEFA Champions League for the first time in 11 years, after ousting FC Basel on the away goals rule.

Fulham
Jokanović lasted just over six months in the role before he elected to return to the Championship, joining Fulham on 27 December 2015 as head coach. After avoiding relegation by 11 points, he achieved his target of a top six position for his first full season at Craven Cottage. He was the EFL Championship Manager of the Month for April 2018 after taking 16 points from 18, having won the same award for Watford three years earlier; his compatriot forward Aleksandar Mitrović took the players' equivalent.

Jokanović led Fulham to promotion by beating Aston Villa 1–0 at Wembley Stadium on 26 May 2018 in the play-off final. On 14 November, however, after seven consecutive winless results and with the team ranking last, he was dismissed and replaced by Claudio Ranieri.

Al-Gharafa
On 16 June 2019, Jokanović was appointed at Qatari club Al-Gharafa SC, on a two-year deal. He was nominated for Manager of the Season in his first year in the Stars League.

Sheffield United
On 27 May 2021, Jokanović was appointed by newly relegated Sheffield United on a three-year deal, becoming the club's first manager from overseas. He was sacked on 25 November, having won six of 19 Championship games.

Dynamo Moscow
On 17 June 2022, Jokanović signed a contract with Russian Premier League club FC Dynamo Moscow for the upcoming season, with the option of two further years depending on performance.

Career statistics

International

Scores and results list FR Yugoslavia's goal tally first, score column indicates score after each Jokanović goal.

Managerial statistics

Honours

Player
Vojvodina
Yugoslav First League: 1988–89

Partizan
First League of FR Yugoslavia: 1992–93
Yugoslav Cup: 1991–92

Deportivo
La Liga: 1999–2000
Supercopa de España: 2000

Manager
Partizan
Serbian SuperLiga: 2007–08, 2008–09
Serbian Cup: 2007–08, 2008–09

Muangthong United
Thai Premier League: 2012

Fulham
EFL Championship play-offs: 2018

Individual
EFL Championship Manager of the Month: April 2015, April 2018

References

External links

Levski Sofia official profile

1968 births
Living people
Footballers from Novi Sad
Yugoslav footballers
Serbia and Montenegro footballers
Serbian footballers
Association football midfielders
Yugoslav First League players
RFK Novi Sad 1921 players
FK Vojvodina players
FK Partizan players
La Liga players
Segunda División players
Real Oviedo players
CD Tenerife players
Deportivo de La Coruña players
Ciudad de Murcia footballers
Premier League players
Chelsea F.C. players
Yugoslavia international footballers
Serbia and Montenegro international footballers
Competitors at the 1991 Mediterranean Games
1998 FIFA World Cup players
UEFA Euro 2000 players
Serbia and Montenegro expatriate footballers
Serbian expatriate footballers
Expatriate footballers in Spain
Expatriate footballers in England
Serbia and Montenegro expatriate sportspeople in Spain
Serbia and Montenegro expatriate sportspeople in England
Serbian expatriate sportspeople in Spain
Serbian expatriate sportspeople in England
Serbian football managers
FK Partizan managers
Slavisa Jokanovic
PFC Levski Sofia managers
Hércules CF managers
Watford F.C. managers
Fulham F.C. managers
Sheffield United F.C. managers
Maccabi Tel Aviv F.C. managers
Al-Gharafa SC managers
FC Dynamo Moscow managers
Segunda División managers
Premier League managers
Israeli Premier League managers
English Football League managers
Russian Premier League managers
Qatar Stars League managers
Serbian expatriate football managers
Expatriate football managers in Thailand
Expatriate football managers in Bulgaria
Expatriate football managers in England
Expatriate football managers in Israel
Expatriate football managers in Qatar
Expatriate football managers in Russia
Serbian expatriate sportspeople in Thailand
Serbian expatriate sportspeople in Bulgaria
Serbian expatriate sportspeople in Israel
Serbian expatriate sportspeople in Qatar
Serbian expatriate sportspeople in Russia
Mediterranean Games competitors for Yugoslavia